Macheh Bon (also known as Haft Tan) is a village in Aliabad Rural District, in the Central District of Qaem Shahr County, Mazandaran Province, Iran. At the 2006 census, its population was 332, in 82 families.

References 

Populated places in Qaem Shahr County